The National Basketball Association All-Star Game is a basketball exhibition game hosted every February by the National Basketball Association (NBA) and showcases 24 of the league's star players. It is the featured event of NBA All-Star Weekend, a three-day event which goes from Friday to Sunday. The All-Star Game was first played at the Boston Garden on March 2, 1951.

The starting lineup for each squad is selected by a combination of fan, player, and media voting, while head coaches choose the reserves, seven players from their respective conferences, so each side has a 12-man roster. Coaches are not allowed to vote for their own players. If a selected player cannot participate because of injury, the NBA commissioner selects a replacement.

Since 2017, the leading vote-getters for each conference are designated as team captains and can choose from the pool of All-Star reserves to form their teams regardless of conference. LeBron James and Stephen Curry became the first players to choose teams through the new format, selecting players for the 2018 NBA All-Star Game in a non-televised draft on January 25. Likely due to fan interest in the draft process, captains for the 2019 All-Star Game, James and Giannis Antetokounmpo, drafted their teams live on TNT. The teams also play for a charity of their choice to help the games remain competitive.

The head coach of the team with the best record in each conference is chosen to lead their respective conference in the All-Star Game, with a prohibition against consecutive appearances. Known as the "Riley Rule", it was created after perennially successful Los Angeles Lakers head coach Pat Riley earned the right to coach the Western Conference team eight times in nine seasons between 1982 and 1990. The coach of the team with the next best record gets to coach instead.

History
The idea of holding an All-Star Game was conceived during a meeting between NBA President Maurice Podoloff, NBA publicity director Haskell Cohen and Boston Celtics owner Walter A. Brown. At that time, the basketball world had just been rocked by the college basketball point-shaving scandal.

To regain public attention to the league, Cohen suggested the league to host an exhibition game featuring the league's best players, similar to Major League Baseball's All-Star Game. Although most people, including Podoloff, were pessimistic about the idea, Brown remained confident that it would be a success, and he offered to host the game and to cover all the expenses or potential losses incurred from the game. 

The first All-Star Game was hosted at the Boston Garden on March 2, 1951, where the Eastern All-Stars team defeated the Western All-Stars team, 111–94. Boston Celtics' Ed Macauley was named as the first NBA All-Star Game Most Valuable Player, and the All-Star Game became a success, drawing an attendance of 10,094, much higher than that season's average attendance of 3,500. 

In 2010, the NBA All-Star Game set the attendance record for a basketball game with 108,713 people attending at Cowboys Stadium in Arlington, Texas. This shattered the existing attendance record previously held at Ford Field on December 13, 2003, when 78,129 attendees watched Michigan State play Kentucky.

The 2017 All-Star Weekend was originally awarded to Charlotte, North Carolina. On March 23, 2016, North Carolina passed House Bill 2, also known as a "bathroom bill," which was seen as discriminatory against transgender persons. As a result, the NBA announced that it would move the game to another city if the bill was not repealed or revised. After North Carolina took no action, on July 21, 2016, the NBA announced that the 2017 game would be moved to New Orleans. In March 2017, after several provisions of the bill were partially repealed, the NBA awarded the 2019 All-Star Weekend to Charlotte.

On October 3, 2017, the NBA and NBPA announced changes to the game format, starting in 2018. Instead of being divided by conference, the top vote leaders for each conference would be team captains and hold a draft to choose among the rest of the starters and reserves, regardless of conference.

Rosters selection
The starting five from each conference consists of three frontcourt players and two guards, selected by a combination of fan, player, and media voting. In 2017, the NBA moved from a pure fan vote to a weighted process wherein fan voting accounts for 50%, with player and media voting account for 25% each. Prior to 2013, fans selected two forwards and one center instead of generic frontcourt players. The NBA in 2003 began offering All-Star ballots in three languages—English, Spanish and Chinese—for fan voting of the starters.

NBA coaches vote for the reserves for their respective conferences, but they cannot choose players from their own team. Each coach selects two guards, three frontcourt players and two wild cards, with each selected player ranked in order of preference within each category. If a multi-position player is to be selected, coaches are encouraged to vote for the player at the position that is "most advantageous for the All-Star team", regardless of where the player is listed on the All-Star ballot or the position he is listed in box scores. If a player is unavailable for the game due to injury, the NBA commissioner selects a replacement for the roster. If the replacement is for a fan-selected starter, the All-Star Game coach chooses the replacement in the starting lineup, and is not limited to the commissioner's addition to the roster. 

Multiple All-Star players can be chosen from one team, with the record being four. This has occurred nine times, the first such instance being in 1962, when four players each from the Boston Celtics and Los Angeles Lakers were chosen. The most recent game with four All-Star players from one team was the Golden State Warriors in the 2018 game.

The game
The game is played under normal NBA rules with some differences. Since the starting All-Stars are selected by fans, players, and media, players sometimes start the game at atypical positions. For instance, in the 2007 game, Kobe Bryant and Tracy McGrady were chosen as the starting Western Conference guards. As both players normally play shooting guard, Bryant started the game as a point guard. Gameplay usually involves players attempting spectacular slam dunks and alley oops and defensive effort is limited. The final score is generally much higher than a competitive NBA game. 

If the score is close, the fourth quarter becomes more competitive. The fourth quarter was changed in 2020 to use the Elam Ending. In normal Elam Ending rules, the game clock is turned off with four minutes remaining and a target score is set; whoever reaches the target wins the game. In 2020, the NBA took the score at the end of three quarters and added 24 points (in honor of Kobe Bryant, who had been killed in a helicopter crash a month prior). With Team Giannis leading Team LeBron 133–124 at the end of the third quarter, the target score was 157 points, and Team LeBron won the contest.

The player introductions are accompanied by significant fanfare, including lighting effects, dance music, DJ's, elaborate portable stages, and pyrotechnics. Special uniforms are designed for the game each year, usually red for the Western Conference and blue for the Eastern Conference. From 1997 to 2002, players could wear their normal team uniforms. The "host conference" also traditionally has light uniforms, except from 2010 to 2014. In the past, players who wore the same number were given the option to pick a different numeral. For example, Patrick Ewing, who normally wore #33, ended up wearing #3 early in his career as Larry Bird also had that number. Since 1997, players can keep their uniform numbers. A major recording artist typically sings "O Canada" and "The Star-Spangled Banner" prior to tipoff.

Halftime is longer than a typical NBA game partly due to musical performances by popular artists. The first such halftime show happened in the 2000 game, with Kenny Wayne Shepherd, Mary J. Blige, 98 Degrees, Montell Jordan, Martina McBride, and LL Cool J performing.

All-Star Game records

All-Star Game results
List of each All-Star Game, the venue at which it was played, and the Game MVP. Parenthesized numbers indicate multiple times that venue, city, or player has occurred as of that instance (e.g. "Michael Jordan (2)" in 1996 indicates that was his second All-Star MVP award). , the Eastern Conference leads with a record of 37 wins and 29 losses. 

Note: Venue names are listed as of the date of the All-Star Game.

Notes
 * – a city without an NBA team in play during that calendar year.
 ** – a game played at the "third" Madison Square Garden on 8th Avenue between 49th and 50th Streets, site of the first three NBA All-Star Games played in Madison Square Garden (1954, 1955 and 1968).
 *** – a game played at the "fourth" (as of 2017) Madison Square Garden that runs from 31st to 33rd Streets from 8th to west of 7th Avenues above the western half of Penn Station in Manhattan that opened in February 1968, approximately one month after the 1968 game was played in the "old" MSG.
 † – an NBA All-Star Game that is held at an NFL or MLB stadium.
 § – a stadium or arena whose venue name has since changed AND the venue has hosted a subsequent NBA All-Star Game under the alternate name.
 Portland, Sacramento, Memphis, and Oklahoma City are the only NBA cities that have not yet hosted an NBA All-Star Game. The Kings did host 2 All-Star Games when they were in Rochester in 1956 and in Cincinnati in 1966 when they were the Royals, and the Thunder had hosted it twice when they were in Seattle in 1974 and 1987 when they were the SuperSonics. Thus leaving the Portland Trail Blazers and the Memphis Grizzlies as the only two franchises never to play host to an NBA All-Star Game.
 New arenas that have not hosted the All-Star Game are Fiserv Forum in Milwaukee, TD Garden in Boston, Miami-Dade Arena in Miami, Gainbridge Fieldhouse in Indianapolis (set to host the 2024 game), American Airlines Center in Dallas (the venue did host the 2010 Rookie Challenge and All-Star Saturday), AT&T Center in San Antonio, FedExForum in Memphis, Little Caesars Arena in Detroit, and Chase Center in San Francisco.
 Other NFL or MLB stadiums that could host the NBA All-Star Game include Mercedes-Benz Stadium in Atlanta, Ford Field in Detroit, NRG Stadium in Houston, Lucas Oil Stadium in Indianapolis, SoFi Stadium in Inglewood (Los Angeles metropolitan area), U.S. Bank Stadium in Minneapolis, Caesars Superdome in New Orleans, State Farm Stadium in Glendale (Phoenix metropolitan area), and Rogers Centre in Toronto.
 # – Arlington, Texas does not have an NBA team within its city limits, but it is a part of the Dallas–Fort Worth metroplex that has an NBA team (the Dallas Mavericks).
 ‡ – the first game played under the Elam scoring format, where instead of a time limit, the fourth quarter would end when either team reached the target score, defined as 24 plus whichever team had more points after three quarters. Team Giannis led 133–124 after three quarters, so the target score was 157. Anthony Davis hit a walk-off free throw to win it.

Other All-Star events

The All-Star Game is the featured event of All-Star Weekend, and it is held on a Sunday night. All-Star Weekend also includes popular exhibition games and competitions featuring NBA players and alumni as well as players from the Women's National Basketball Association (WNBA) and NBA G League (G League).

See also

 List of NBA All-Stars
 WNBA All-Star Game

Notes

References

External links
 NBA All-Star Game at NBA.com
 NBA All-Star Game at Basketball-Reference.com
 NBA All-Star Game at ESPN.com

Recurring sporting events established in 1951
 
Basketball all-star games
Annual sporting events in the United States
1951 establishments in the United States